2L or 2-L  may refer to:
Helvetic Airways IATA code
Second Life
Second year law school student in the United States
2-liter bottle

See also
L2 (disambiguation)